Kornél Bardóczky (born 5 July 1978) is a retired professional male tennis player from Hungary.

Bardóczky reached his highest individual ranking on the ATP Tour on 5 July 2004, when he became World number 254.  He primarily plays on the Futures circuit and the Challenger tour.

Bardóczky is a member of the Hungarian Davis Cup team, having posted a 17–13 record in singles and a 12–7 record in doubles in twenty-eight ties played between 1997 and 2012. He has also won the Hungarian National Tennis Championships three times – 2001, 2002, and 2006.

Satellite, Future and Challenger finals

Singles: 27 (18–9)

Doubles 52 (32–20)

Davis Cup

Participations: (29–20)

   indicates the outcome of the Davis Cup match followed by the score, date, place of event, the zonal classification and its phase, and the court surface.

Record against other players

Bardóczky's match record against players who have been ranked in the top 100, with those who are active in boldface. 
ATP Tour, Challenger and Future tournaments' main draw and qualifying matches are considered.

External links
 
 
 

1978 births
Living people
Hungarian male tennis players
Hungarian tennis coaches
People from Kecskemét
Sportspeople from Bács-Kiskun County